Serena Gosden-Hood is a British academic and writer. She has written for a number of publications, including The Times Literary Supplement and The London Magazine.

References

Living people
Yale University alumni
Alumni of Durham University
English writers
21st-century English women writers
British women essayists
English women non-fiction writers
English journalists
Year of birth missing (living people)
21st-century essayists